Rebecca Creedy (born 12 March 1983) is an Australian swimmer who won three bronze medals in freestyle relays at the World Championships in 1998 and 1999. Rebecca Creedy won a gold medal in the women's 4 × 100 m freestyle relay in the Kuala Lumpur Commonwealth Games. Creedy attended Southern Cross Catholic College in Redcliffe, QLD Australia.

She later switched to triathlon and won national ironman tournaments in 2009 and 2012. She has a bachelor's degree in environmental science and lives in Maroochydore. She has twin brothers.

See also
 List of World Aquatics Championships medalists in swimming (women)
 List of Commonwealth Games medallists in swimming (women)

References

1983 births
Living people
Australian female freestyle swimmers
Australian female triathletes
World Aquatics Championships medalists in swimming
Medalists at the FINA World Swimming Championships (25 m)
Commonwealth Games medallists in swimming
Commonwealth Games gold medallists for Australia
Commonwealth Games silver medallists for Australia
Swimmers at the 1998 Commonwealth Games
Swimmers at the 2002 Commonwealth Games
Medallists at the 1998 Commonwealth Games
Medallists at the 2002 Commonwealth Games